Fifi may refer to:

Arts and entertainment
 Fifi (Better Call Saul), an episode of the TV show
 Fifi, a Beverly Hills Teens character
 Fifi (Peanuts), a love interest of Snoopy
 Fifi La Fume, in Tiny Toon Adventures 
 Fifi the Peke, a Disney character
 Fifi and the Flowertots, a British children's TV series
 Fifi, a Shrek character
 Fifi, a poodle in Rugrats
 Fifi, in the Open Season film series

People
 Fifi (singer) (Filloreta Raçi, born 1994), Kosovo-Albanian singer and songwriter
 Fifi, diminutive form of Josephine
 Fifi Abdou (born 1953), Egyptian belly dancer and actress
 Fifi Banvard (1901–1962), Australian actress
 Fifi Box (born 1977), Australian radio broadcaster, comedian, and TV personality
 Fifi Colston (born 1960), artist, author and TV presenter
 Fifi Cooper (born 1991), South African recording artist
 Fifi D'Orsay (1904–1983), Canadian-American actress billed as Mademoiselle Fifi
 Fifi Ejindu (born 1962), Nigerian architect and philanthropist
 Fifi Mukuna (born 1968), Congolese cartoonist and caricaturist
 Fiifi Kwetey (born 1967), Ghanaian politician
 Fifi Saksena (born 1992), the finest fifi
 Fifi Young (1915–1975), Indonesian actress 
 Fiore Buccieri (1907–1973), Chicago mobster nicknamed Fifi
 Marie Christine Chilver (1920–2007), secret agent during World War II, code-named "Fifi"
 Ingrid Finger, German beauty queen nicknamed Fifi
 Fifi (Wendy Barlow), "maid" to Ric Flair in WCW in 1993, later his wife

Places 
 Fifi, Morocco
 Mount Fifi, Canadian Rockies

Other uses
 Fifi (chimpanzee) (c.1958 – 2004), in the Kasakela chimpanzee community
 Fifi hook, a climbing aid
 Fifi, prison slang for artificial vagina
 Faifi language, or Fifi
 FIFI (aircraft), a Boeing B-29 Superfortress
 HMS Fifi, an 1894 ship of the Royal Navy
 Fifi shipwreck, a submerged shipwreck off Bahrain
 Federation of International Football Independents
 FiFi Awards, in the fragrance industry
 Tropical Storm Fifi, the name of several storms

See also

 Fifie, a design of sailing boat 
 Mademoiselle Fifi (disambiguation)
 Michael Fifi'i, Solomon Islands footballer